The 1999 season was the eighth full year of competitive football (soccer) in Estonia since gaining independence from the Soviet Union on 20 August 1991.

National Leagues

Meistriliiga

Esiliiga

Estonian FA Cup

Final

Estonian Super Cup

National Team

Notes

External links
1999 season on RSSSF
RSSSF Historic Results
RSSSF National Team Results

 
Seasons in Estonian football